Czuchleby  is a village in the administrative district of Gmina Łosice, within Łosice County, Masovian Voivodeship, in east-central Poland.

References

Czuchleby
Siedlce Governorate
Kholm Governorate
Lublin Voivodeship (1919–1939)